The FA Youth Cup sponsored by E.ON 2009–10 was the 58th edition of the FA Youth Cup.

467 clubs were initially accepted, although there was one withdrawal, Worcester City 53 of the remaining 466 teams were new entries.

Holders Arsenal were knocked out in the fourth Round at home to Ipswich Town 0–2.

Chelsea won the competition by beating Aston Villa 3–2 on aggregate to win the competition for only their third time in their history and for the first time since 1961.

First round

Second round

Third round
The 20 Premier League and 24 Championship teams enter at this stage, along with the winners of the second round.

Fourth round

Fifth round

Quarter-finals

Semi-finals

First leg

Second leg

Chelsea won 5–0 on aggregate.

Aston Villa won 2–1 on aggregate.

Final

Route to the final

First leg

Second leg

Chelsea won 3 – 2 on aggregate

See also
2009–10 Premier Academy League
2009–10 Premier Reserve League
2009–10 FA Cup
2009–10 in English football

References

External links
The FA Youth Cup at The Football Association official website

2009–10 domestic association football cups
2009–10 in English football
2009-10